Janko Veselinović (Serbian Cyrillic: Јанко Веселиновић; born November 6, 1965) is a Serbian academic and politician. He is a professor at the University of Novi Sad Faculty of Agriculture and a Deputy of the National Assembly of Serbia. He holds a master's degree in contracts on commercial representation and a PhD on legal regulation of governance in domestic and comparative law.

Professional career 
From 1991 to 2001 he worked in the YUCO company in Novi Sad, in the area of law degree and later as general manager of YUCO HEMIJE. By decision of the Assembly of Novi Sad in 2002 he was appointed as director of the JKP "Novosadska toplana" (PUC Novi Sad Heating), and from 2004 he was the Assistant Secretary of Science and Technology in the Executive Council of the Autonomous Province of Vojvodina. Since 2008. he is a deputy of the National Assembly of Serbia.
On the Faculty of Agriculture on University of Novi Sad he is teaching the Corporate law and Law and contracts in tourism.

Political career 
He started his political career with the League of Communists of Yugoslavia and was its member until the dissolution of the party on 22 January 1990. He was a member of the Democratic Party from 1998–2014. From 2004 to 2006 he was vice president of the City Council of Novi Sad. He was a member of the Provincial Board of the Democratic Central Committee and the Democratic Party. Since 2008 he is a member of the Serbian Parliament. He is the President of the Parliamentary Friendship Group with Croatia in the National Assembly of the Republic of Serbia. He is the president of the subcommittee on the status of Serbs in the diaspora issues. He also works with many associations working on minority rights in Serbia.

Books by Veselinović 
 Controlling Management (Upravljački menadžment), textbook, Novi Sad, 2003, 327 pages
 Business Law for Managers (Poslovno pravo za menadžere), tutorial book, 2005, 234 pages
 Commercial Law (Privredno pravo), textbook, S. Carić, M. Vitez, J. Veselinović, Novi Sad, 2006–2008, 404 pages
 Contracts and payment in tourism (Ugovori i sredstva plaćanja u turizmu), textbook, J. Veselinović, Novi Sad, 2011, 141 pages
 Commercial Law (Privredno pravo), textbook, J. Veselinović, Novi Sad, 2011, 231 pages

Scientific works 
 Economic functions of leasing, Legal Life (Pravni život), 1997., No. 11, the third
 The rights and obligations of the parties in the lease contract, Law - Theory and Practice (Pravo – teorija i praksa), 1997, no. 12.
 Agreement on trade representation in business practice, Legal Life (Pravni život), 1998. No. 11, the third
 The legal nature of agreements on trade representation, Law - Theory and Practice (Pravo – teorija i praksa), 1999, No.1.
 Normative regulation of executive management in Yugoslavia and the countries of the former Yugoslavia (Bosnia and Herzegovina, Croatia, Macedonia, Slovenia), Law - Theory and Practice (Pravo – teorija i praksa), 2001, no. 2.
 Legal frameworks management in Yugoslavia and other countries of the former Yugoslavia, Legal Life (Pravni život), 2001, no. 11, the third
 Control Management, Legal Life (Pravni život), 2003, no. 11, the third
 Control Management - here and in comparative law, The Chance, 2004, no. 14.
 Joint stock company under the new law on companies, Law - Theory and Practice (Pravo – teorija i praksa), 2005., No. 7-8.
 Limited stock company under the new Company Law, 2005, no. 9
 Joint stock company under the new Company Law, Legal Life (Pravni život), 2005. No. 11, the third
 Joint Stock Company in the Republic of Serbia under the new Company Law, Legal Word (Pravna riječ), journal of legal theory and practice, Bosnia and Herzegovina, Serbian Republic, Banja Luka, 2005, no. 5.
 Serbia's treatment of the Serbs in the region - the truth and fallacies, myths and stereotypes of nationalism and communism in the former Yugoslavia / - Salyburg, Center for History, Democracy and Reconciliation - Novi Sad, Graf Marketing - Novi Sad, 9 June 2008.
 Return of refugees and displaced persons and protection of minority rights, as a condition of normalization of relations between Serbs and Croats, editor Darko Gavrilovic, Serbo-Croat Relations in the 20th century - history and perspectives, 2008, 21-36, Salzburg - Novi Sad, Institute for Historical Justice and Reconciliation, Center for History, Democracy and Reconciliation,  COBISS.SR-ID 235 201 287 329 UDC (497.4/.7): 316 344 1994 CIP (497.11:497.5) "19" (082)
 The status, importance and perspectives of the parties of Serbian and Croatian minorities in Croatia and Serbia, Darko Gavrilovic editor, Serbo-Croat Relations: Political Cooperation and National Minorities, 2009, Salzburg - Novi Sad, Institute for Historical Justice and Reconciliation - Center for History, Democracy and Reconciliation, COBISS.SR-ID 243192327, CIP 94 (497.11:497.5) "19" (082)
 Legal frameworks for rural development in our country and comparative law, Agricultural Economics, 2009, no. 41-42, pp. 53–68. ISSN 0350-5928
 The criminal liability of legal persons in our law, Law - Theory and Practice (Pravo – teorija i praksa), 2009, no. 3-4, pp. 48–58, ISSN 0352-3713, UDC: 347.191:343.222
 Adoption of the Diaspora and Serbs in the region, Nations, States and Diasporas of the former Yugoslavia, 2010, Sremska Kamenica, Institute for Historical Justice and Reconciliation - Center for History, Democracy and Reconciliation, COBISS.SR-ID 246847239, CIP 94 (497.1) (082)
 Relations between Serbia and Croatia and the European Union, the challenges of European integration, Journal of Law and Economics of European Integration, Official Gazette, 2010, Belgrade, pp. 57–75, ISSN 1820-9459, UDK 327 (497.11:497.5) "19/20", 341 238 (497.11:497.5) "20", 341 217 (4-672EU: 497.5 497.11)

References

External links 
Members of Serbo-Croatian Friendship, National Assembly Delegation Met with the Croatian Parliament
 Delegation of the Committee on relation with Serbs visit Serbia and Bosnia and Herzegovina
 Round table on problems related to pensioners from Croatia
 Established friendship groups with Croatia
 Croatia – Serbia – Delegation
 Serb Pararmilitary [sic] Group in Croatia
 Serb Parliamentary Group with president Josipović
 Region sa još uvek previše konflikata
 Susret s Tadićem kad se stvore uvjeti

1965 births
Living people
Serbs of Croatia
People from Knin
Politicians from Novi Sad
League of Communists of Yugoslavia politicians
Democratic Party (Serbia) politicians
Social Democratic Party (Serbia) politicians
Members of the National Assembly (Serbia)
University of Novi Sad alumni
Academic staff of the University of Novi Sad